Stillingia scutellifera is a species of flowering plant in the family Euphorbiaceae. It was described in 1951. It is native to Paraguay and Argentina.

References

scutellifera
Plants described in 1951
Flora of Paraguay
Flora of Argentina